The 2009 Southern Conference men's basketball tournament took place between Friday, March 6 and Monday, March 9 in Chattanooga, Tennessee, at McKenzie Arena. The semifinals were televised by SportSouth, and the Southern Conference Championship Game was televised by ESPN.

Standings

Bracket

All-Tournament Team
First Team
Stephen McDowell, Chattanooga
Tony White Jr., College of Charleston
Stephen Curry, Davidson
Kevin Goffney, Chattanooga
Bryan Friday, Samford

Second Team
Nicchaeus Doaks, Chattanooga
Dustin Scott, College of Charleston
Donald Sims, Appalachian State
Andrew Goudelock, College of Charleston
Jeremy Simmons, College of Charleston

References

Tournament
SoCon
Southern Conference men's basketball tournament
Southern Conference men's basketball tournament
Southern Conference men's basketball tournament
College sports tournaments in Tennessee
Basketball competitions in Tennessee